On Tuesday 1 March 1988, Comair Flight 206, an Embraer EMB-110P1 Bandeirante flying from Phalaborwa to Johannesburg was approaching Johannesburg International Airport to land when it broke up in flight over Germiston. Reports indicated an explosive device on board; the cockpit was found a quarter of a kilometer away from the rest of the fuselage, despite the flight having been relatively low at the time of the accident. A miner on board had taken out a large life insurance policy shortly before the flight. There were no survivors.

Comair continued to use the flight code on a different route between Durban and Johannesburg up until their financial collapse in 2022.

See also 
Pan Am Flight 103
Federal Express Flight 705
Continental Airlines Flight 11
National Airlines Flight 2511
United Airlines Flight 629
Avianca Flight 203

References 

Aviation accidents and incidents in South Africa
Accidents and incidents involving the Embraer EMB 110 Bandeirante
1988 in South Africa
Aviation accidents and incidents in 1988
Airliner bombings